Õismäe (Estonian for "Blossom Hill") is a subdistrict in the district of Haabersti, Tallinn. As of 1 January 2014, it has a population of 1,117.

Õismäe encompasses also Õismäe Bog.

First mentionings of the area, come from 1646 (Heuschlag Heise Nehm); 1808 the farmhouse (Eisneme) and 1873 the manor (Hofstelle Öismäe).

References

Subdistricts of Tallinn